Macairea are a genus of flowering plants in the family Melastomataceae, native to South America. They are shrubs with terete branches, and have four petals per flower.

Species
Currently accepted species include:

Macairea axilliflora Wurdack
Macairea cardonae Wurdack
Macairea chimantensis Wurdack
Macairea cuieirasii S.S.Renner
Macairea duidae Gleason
Macairea lanata Gleason
Macairea lasiophylla (Benth.) Wurdack
Macairea linearis Gleason
Macairea maroana Wurdack
Macairea multinervia Benth.
Macairea neblinae Wurdack
Macairea pachyphylla Benth.
Macairea parvifolia Benth.
Macairea philipsonii S.S.Renner
Macairea radula DC.
Macairea rigida Benth.
Macairea rotundifolia Cogn. & Hoehne
Macairea rufescens DC.
Macairea spruceana O.Berg ex Triana
Macairea stylosa Triana
Macairea sulcata Triana
Macairea theresiae Cogn.
Macairea thyrsiflora DC.

References

Melastomataceae
Melastomataceae genera